

Danggali is a locality in the Australian state of South Australia located about  north  of the town of Renmark and about  north east of the state capital of Adelaide.

The locality was established on 26 April 2013 in respect to “the long established local name.”

The land use within Danggali is concerned with the following protected areas, the Danggali Conservation Park and the Danggali Wilderness Protection Area which have fully occupied its extent since its establishment in 2013.

The 2016 Australian census which was conducted in August 2016 reports that Danggali had a population of zero.

Danggali is located within the federal divisions of Barker and Grey, the state electoral districts of Chaffey and Stuart, the Pastoral Unincorporated Area of South Australia and the state’s Murray and Mallee region.

See also
List of cities and towns in South Australia
Riverland Biosphere Reserve

References

Towns in South Australia
Places in the unincorporated areas of South Australia